The Wayne Independent was an American daily newspaper published Tuesdays through Saturdays in Honesdale, Pennsylvania. It was owned by Gannett.

It was the only daily serving Wayne County, Pennsylvania. It was founded as a semiweekly publication in 1878.

References

External links
 The Wayne Independent - wayneindependent.com
 Carbondale News - thecarbondalenews.com
 The News Eagle - neagle.com
 The Villager - moscowvillager.com

Daily newspapers published in Pennsylvania
Wayne County, Pennsylvania
Publications established in 1878
Gannett publications